Ujjain - Bhopal passenger is a passenger train of the Indian Railways, which runs between Ujjain Junction railway station of Ujjain which cultural capital and holy city of Madhya Pradesh and Bhopal Junction railway station of Bhopal, the capital of Central Indian state Madhya Pradesh.

Arrival and departure
 Train no. 59319 departs from Ujjain daily at 17:05, reaching Bhopal the same day at 22:15.
 Train no. 59320 departs from Bhopal daily at 06:40. from platform no.5 reaching Ujjain the same day at 11:05.

Route and halts

The train goes via Maksi. The important halts of the train are :

 Ujjain Junction
 Pingleshwar
 Tajpur
 Shivpura
 Tarana Road
 Maksi Junction
 Pir Umrod
 Berchha
 Kisoni
 Kali Sindh
 Bolai
 Akodia
 Mohammadkhera
 Shujalpur
 Kalapipal
 Jabri
 Parbati
 Baktal
 Sehore
 Pachwan
 Phanda
 Bakanian Bhaunr
 Bairagarh
 Bhopal Junction

Coach composite
The train consists of 18 coaches:
 1 First Class
 4 Sleeper coaches
 10 Unreserved
 1 Ladies/Handicapped
 2 Luggage/Brake van

Average speed and frequency
The train runs with an average speed of 35 km/h. The train runs on a daily basis.

Loco link
The train is hauled by Vadodara (BRC) WAM-4/WAP-4 electric locomotive.

The train is maintained by the Indore Coaching Depot. The same rake is used for five trains, which are Indore–Chhindwara Panchvalley Express, Indore–Maksi Passenger, Bhopal–Ujjain Passenger, Bhopal–Indore Passenger and Bhopal–Bina Passenger for one way which is altered by the second rake on the other way.

See also

 Avantika Express
 Ujjain Junction
 Bhopal Junction

References

Transport in Bhopal
Railway services introduced in 1996
Rail transport in Madhya Pradesh
Slow and fast passenger trains in India
Transport in Ujjain